Pinus torreyana subsp. torreyana is a subspecies of pine in the family Pinaceae. It is native to California.

Status
It is listed as critically endangered by the IUCN.

References

Flora of California
Critically endangered plants
torreyana subsp. torreyana